"Treat U Rite" is a R&B/Soul song by American singer-songwriter Angela Winbush. Released on January 13, 1994 as the first single from her third solo album, Angela Winbush. This song was her first single in over four years, from her first album of new music in over five years. The song was recorded and mixed at Aire LA Studios by Raymundo Silva. Winbush performed the song on an episode of Soul Train, which aired on May 14, 1994.

Charts
The song entered the U.S. Billboard R&B chart on February 26, 1994, where it spent twenty two weeks on the chart, peaking at number six. The song spent six weeks in the top ten of the R&B/Hip Hop Songs Chart. And Peaked at #117 at the billboard hot 100

Weekly charts

Year-end charts

References

Angela Winbush songs
1994 singles
1994 songs
Elektra Records singles
Songs written by Chuckii Booker